Febel is the surname of the following people:

Fritz Febel (1909–1969), German-American football player and coach
Reinhard Febel (born 1952), German composer

Surnames of German origin